RLF Brands is a US manufacturer of Shopsmith combination machines for woodworking. The brand has its origins in the ShopSmith 10ER launched in the late 1940s, an immediate success with do-it-yourself homeowners. Later the brand changed hands twice before becoming dormant in 1966. Shopsmith, Inc. was founded in 1972 to resume manufacture of ShopSmith parts and products. In 2009 Shopsmith, Inc. went into bankruptcy, and reorganized as RLF Brands. RLF continues to use the Shopsmith brand name.

Origins
Shopsmith has its origins in the ShopSmith 10E and 10ER tool, a five-in-one woodworking tool for do-it-yourself consumers invented in the late 1940s by Hans Goldschmidt, an immigrant from Germany.
It found a ready market among new homeowners in the period after World War II (1939–45).
The compact ShopSmith 10ER combined a table saw, lathe, drill press, disc sander and horizontal boring machine.
It was manufactured by Goldschmidt’s Magna Engineering Corporation of San Diego, California.
Successive models included additional accessories such as a bandsaw, jigsaw, jointer and belt sander.
The lawn and garden tool manufacturer Yuba Power Products of Cleveland, Ohio bought Magna and the ShopSmith product line in the late 1950s.
A few years later a group of Yuba employees founded  Magna American Corporation and purchased the ShopSmith assets.
They started manufacturing in Raymond, Mississippi, but their company ceased operation prior to 1966.

During this time frame, Shopsmith produced several new models including the MK2, MK5, and MKVII.

Shopsmith, Inc.
When searching for a replacement saw blade John Folkerth, a stockbroker in Dayton, Ohio, came across what was left of the company in Raymond, including the manufacturing equipment and boxes of unfilled orders for parts. He obtained investors and launched Shopsmith Inc. in 1972 to resume manufacturing in Troy, Ohio. The plan was to produce spare parts for the old tools sold by Magna and Yuba, but the company soon decided to start selling complete tools based on the popular and robust Mark V.
The company moved to Dayton, Ohio in the late 1970s.
Around the end of 1981 McGraw-Edison sold its power-tool division to Shopsmith, Inc..
Shopsmith liquidated the inventory and started to manufacture "Benchmark" products.
In April 2005 the company reported gross annual revenues of US$13.4 million, with a net loss of US$800,000.

Along with making the Shopsmith MKV, the company produces accessories for the machine, which have included a bandsaw, jigsaw, jointer, belt sander, scroll saw, air compressor, and planer. These accessories are referred to as SPTs or 'Single Purpose Tools'. Shopsmith has also produced a variety of stands allowing these SPTs to be used separately from the MKV, with a separate motor.

The MKV 500 model has been retired and replaced with the MKV 505, 510 and 520 models. The 505/510 models were introduced in 1985 and the 520 in 1999. The 505/510/520 models offer larger tables and greater flexibility, using a combination of tubes and telescoping legs which allow the tables to placed in a variety of positions. 

In 2010 the company added the Mark 7 model, which offers a digitally controlled motor with reverse, and a double tilt mechanism. The new design offers greater horsepower, constant torque, and more flexibility.

RLF Brands
Shopsmith filed for bankruptcy in 2009 and reorganized, at first under the name of RLF Shop.
RLF Brands LLC was registered in Ohio as a Domestic Limited Liability Company by Robert L Folkerth on 1 June 2010.
As of 2014 the company continued to market the Shopsmith Mark V and Mark 7 multipurpose tools, with seven different tools and various accessories.

References

Sources

Tool manufacturing companies of the United States